The Minardi M189 was a Formula One car, designed for Minardi by Nigel Cowperthwaite for use in the 1989 FIA Formula One World Championship. Introduced partway through the year and driven by Pierluigi Martini and Luis Perez-Sala, it scored several points finishes for the team. Updated as the M189B for the  season, it was used for the first two races of the year before being replaced by the Minardi M190.

Design and development
The Minardi M189 was designed by Nigel Cowperthwaite. Running on Pirelli tyres, it was powered by a Ford Cosworth DFZ V8, the same type of engine that had been used the previous season in the Minardi M188.

Racing history
The Minardi M189 made its first appearance partway through the 1989 Formula One season at the Mexican Grand Prix, where it was driven by Pierluigi Martini and Luis Perez-Sala, both of whom had driven for the team the previous year. Martini qualified in 22nd but retired from the race with engine problems. Sala failed to qualify for the race, and this proved to be an ongoing problem for the Spaniard. He failed to qualify for three more races. 

After making the car's debut in Mexico, Martini failed to complete the next three races but at the British Grand Prix not only finished, but scored two points for placing fifth. Sala backed this up with sixth at the same race, which was his best finish of the year. Martini finished fifth again in Portugal, where he had qualified fifth on the grid, and sixth (from third on the grid) in Australia.

Minardi finished the year with six points for 11th in the Constructor's Championship, while Martini was equal 14th, alongside Johnny Herbert, in the Driver's Championship with five points. 

When the 1990 season began, Minardi's new car was still being completed so the M189 was updated to an M189B spec and pressed into service for the first two races of the year. Martini qualified on the front row for the United States Grand Prix but went on to finish seventh. He placed ninth in the following race in Brazil, the car's last grand prix before the Minardi M190 was introduced at San Marino.

Livery 
The M189 had a white diagonal stripe added to its traditional black and yellow livery. Spanish brand Lois was the primary sponsor.

Complete Formula One World Championship results
(key)

Notes

1989 Formula One season cars
1990 Formula One season cars
Minardi Formula One cars